Eeva Putro is a Finnish actress and screenwriter.

Biography 
Putro was born in Vantaa, Finland.

In 2021 Putro's film Tove was the Finnish submission to the 93rd Academy Awards for Best International Feature Film.

Filmography 

 2007 - The Border
 2008 - Blackout
 2009 - Forbidden Fruit
 2011 - Isän kuolema
 2011 - The Inspector
 2011 - Silence
 2017 - Innuendo
 2019 - Joulukalenteri: Tonttuakatemia
 2020 - Tove (also wrote the screenplay)

References

External links 
 

People from Vantaa
Finnish actresses
Finnish screenwriters
Year of birth missing (living people)
Living people
Finnish women screenwriters